Cristián Eduardo Zapata Valencia (born 30 September 1986) is a Colombian professional footballer who plays as a centre-back for Atlético Nacional. A quick and physically powerful defender, known for his hard marking of opponents and strength in the air, he usually plays as a centre back. Although naturally right footed, he can also play as a full-back on either side of the pitch, as he is comfortable with both feet.

Zapata began his career in Colombia with Deportivo Cali in 2004, moving to Serie A club Udinese the following year. After spending several seasons with Udinese, Zapata signed for Spanish club Villarreal. In 2012, he returned to Italy, joining AC Milan. Following the expiration of his contract with the Rossoneri, he joined Italian top-flight counterpart Genoa in 2019, departing in 2021 to join Argentine Primera División side San Lorenzo. 

A Colombian international since 2008, he has represented his nation at the 2011, 2015, 2016, and 2019 editions of the Copa América, as well at the 2014 and 2018 FIFA World Cups.

Club career

Early career and Udinese
A product of Deportivo Cali's youth academy, Zapata was quickly promoted to the first team in 2004. In his first season, Zapata played a total of 25 games with Los Azucareros while also consolidating himself as a key component of the team's defensive end. After exhibiting quality defensive assets in his debut season, several European teams were interested in acquiring him. Ultimately, his destiny laid in Udine and eventually joined Serie A club Udinese. Also, this leap to European football was one month before his 19th birthday and ultimately consisted of a €550,000 transfer fee.

Zapata was signed by Udinese on 31 August 2005 from Deportivo Cali, along with team-mate Abel Aguilar. Both of them were scouted by Udinese while playing at the U-20 World Cup. He made his first appearance with the squad on 19 November 2005 against Messina Pelero for the Serie A. On 18 September 2006, Zapata signed a new five-year contract. That season he started 35 Serie A games. Cristián Zapata employed Claudio Pasqualin (of P.D.P. srl) as his agent on 21 February 2006, but fired him on 9 July 2007. In 2009 the Tribunale Nazionale di Arbitrato per lo Sport awarded Pasqualin eligible to receive €38,900 as agent fee that Zapata owed Pasqualin (5% of annual salary times 2 seasons, 2006–07 and 2007–08).

In October 2007, Zapata along with Andrea Dossena, Roman Eremenko and Simone Pepe was awarded new contracts until June 2012. In June 2008, Zapata was injured and missed 6 months. In the 2009–10 season, Zapata usually played as central defender, partnered with Andrea Coda.

Brief spell at Villarreal
After the 2010–11 season, Cristián Zapata claimed that many top European clubs were interested in signing him. Zapata signed for Villarreal CF on 12 July 2011. On Wednesday 17 August 2011, in the 2011–12 season, Cristián Zapata made his debut against Udinese in a Champions League qualifier. His La Liga debut came on 29 August against FC Barcelona at the Camp Nou. Deployed as a right-back for the entire game, Zapata and Villareal suffered a harsh 5–0 defeat.

Initially in the season, Zapata would be a regular starter and a key player for Miguel Ángel Lotina. In addition, he was in constant rotation between a right-back and centre-back position. On 31 October, Zapata suffered a knee injury that ruled him out for 35 days. Subsequently, he missed a total of six games including two UEFA Champions League group stage matches against Manchester City and Bayern Munich. He made his return from injury in the final group stage match against Italian side Napoli. Following a 0–2 defeat, Villareal finished last of their group with 0 points. 

On the last match-day of the season, Zapata played the entire match against Atletico Madrid as Villareal were relegated with fellow countryman Radamel Falcao scoring the only goal of the game for Atletico. In total, Zapata played 36 matches and provided 1 assist throughout all competitions during his time at Villareal.

AC Milan
In August 2012, Villarreal announced that Zapata had left the club to join AC Milan on a season-long loan. Zapata made headline news in the Champions league against Spanish giants Barcelona: Milan's opening goal in a 2–0 victory of the first leg involved the ball being deflected on to his hand and landing in front of Kevin-Prince Boateng who scored seconds later. The referee did not judge it an attempted touch of the ball but allowed Boateng's goal to be counted, while Zapata was credited with an 'assist'. The replay showed the ball making contact with his face. In his first Milan derby against Inter Milan, Zapata was praised for his defending and for playing a key role in counter-attacks. In 2013, Zapata signed a contract with Milan until summer 2016.

In January 2015, Zapata suffered an injury keeping him sidelined for two months. Upon recovery, he featured as an unused substitute.

On 5 February 2017, Zapata was named as captain in his first league game of the season, a 0–1 home defeat against Sampdoria, due to the absence of team captain Riccardo Montolivo and third captain Mattia De Sciglio because of injuries. Vice-captain Ignazio Abate later appeared in the game as a substitute with Zapata keeping the captain's armband. On 15 April 2017, Zapata scored an equalizer in the Milan derby against Inter Milan at the 97th minute. The match resulted in a 2–2 draw. It was also the first Milan game under the ownership of Rossoneri Sport Investment, headed by Li Yonghong, with Zapata giving away his jersey as a gift to the Chinese entrepreneur soon after the final whistle.

On 17 April 2018 he was confirmed to be vice-captain instead of Giacomo Bonaventura as he kept the armband during the game against S.S.C. Napoli, where captain Leonardo Bonucci was unavailable and Giacomo Bonaventura was playing, he celebrated this news with an outstanding performance with his former Villarreal CF teammate Mateo Musacchio.

Zapata began the 2018–19 season with injury, and was third-choice centre-back behind Musacchio and Alessio Romagnoli. His first appearance of the season came on 4 October, in Milan's second Europa League match, a 3–1 at home to Olympiacos. Zapata started the club's final five matches in Europe, including their final match away to Olympiacos, in which Zapata scored at both ends in the second half, two minutes apart. Milan entered the match three points ahead of Olympiacos, seeking to qualify for the knockout stage alongside Real Betis. Milan were losing 1–0 prior to Zapata's goals; the own goal would have sent Olympiacos through on away goals, and the proper goal would have sent Milan through on aggregate. A late penalty was scored by Kostas Fortounis for Olympiacos, and Milan were eliminated as the 3–1 result held, their first group stage elimination in Europe since 2001.

Zapata's Serie A season debut came on 7 October, at home to Chievo Verona. However, Zapata would not play regularly until Musacchio picked up an injury against Real Betis on 8 November. Musacchio missed five games due to the injury, but did not regain his place in the Serie A team following his return to fitness. Zapata started seven of Milan's final eight Serie A matches in 2018 following Musacchio's injury, and also started the club's Coppa Italia extra-time win over Sampdoria and their Supercoppa Italiana defeat to Juventus in 2019. Zapata's run in the team came to an end as he picked up an injury early in Milan's first Serie A game of 2019, away to Genoa. He would not be named to a match-day squad for two months, and by the time he returned, Musacchio had cemented his place in the back line alongside Romagnoli. Zapata would get two more starts the rest of the campaign, finishing the season with 20 appearances in all competitions as his contract with the club expired.

Genoa
On 2 July 2019, Zapata signed a two-year contract with Serie A club Genoa on a free transfer. Upon his arrival, he became the first Colombian player to sign for Genoa.

International career

Zapata was a member of Colombian U-20 team that won the 2005 South American Youth Championship and the team that played at 2005 FIFA World Youth Championship, who lost to Argentina in the round of 16. Zapata was unavailable in the first 2014 FIFA World Cup qualification match.

In the 2014 FIFA World Cup qualification match, Zapata finally got his first spot chance since under new coach Jose Pekerman against South American leaders Argentina. In the 26th minute, while defending the ball inside Colombia's box from Gonzalo Higuaín, Higuain fell to the side while losing balance and kicked the thigh of Zapata in anger. In reaction, Zapata questioned him and kicked him back, resulting in him receiving a red card along with Higuain. Zapata was later criticized for not controlling himself and allowing the referee to give Higuain the red card while simply walking away, which would have allowed Colombia an 11 men advantage over a 10 men Argentina.

In May 2018 he was named in Colombia's preliminary 35-man squad for the 2018 FIFA World Cup in Russia.

On 30 May 2019, Zapata was included in the 23-man final Colombia squad for the 2019 Copa América.

Personal life
Zapata's aunt Limbaina Zapata was kidnapped on 1 May 2013. The kidnappers demanded $150 million in ransom. The following day, the National Police of Colombia located the thieves in Miranda, Cauca, Colombia, and Limbaina Zapata was released with no harm.

He is the cousin of fellow professional footballer Duván Zapata.

On 7 November 2020 he tested positive for COVID-19.

Career statistics

Club

International

As of match played 10 November 2017. Colombia score listed first, score column indicates score after each Zapata goal.

Honours
AC Milan
Supercoppa Italiana: 2016

Atlético Nacional
Superliga Colombiana: 2023

Colombia U20
South American Youth Championship: 2005

Colombia
Copa América third place: 2016

References

External links

1986 births
Living people
Colombian footballers
Colombian expatriate footballers
Colombian people of African descent
Sportspeople from Cauca Department
Association football central defenders
Colombia under-20 international footballers
Colombia international footballers
2011 Copa América players
2014 FIFA World Cup players
2015 Copa América players
Copa América Centenario players
2018 FIFA World Cup players
2019 Copa América players
Deportivo Cali footballers
Udinese Calcio players
Villarreal CF players
A.C. Milan players
Genoa C.F.C. players
San Lorenzo de Almagro footballers
Categoría Primera A players
Serie A players
La Liga players
Colombian expatriate sportspeople in Italy
Colombian expatriate sportspeople in Spain
Expatriate footballers in Italy
Expatriate footballers in Spain